Babcock State Park is a state park located along the New River Gorge on  wooded in Fayette County, West Virginia.  It is located approximately 20 miles away from the New River Gorge Bridge.

Located near the park headquarters, the Glade Creek Grist Mill is commonly photographed. It was named in honor of Edward V. Babcock. Completed in 1976 by combining parts of three other West Virginia grist mills, it is a replica of the original Cooper's Mill that was located nearby. The park's web site describes the Glade Creek Grist Mill as a living, working monument to the more than 500 mills that used to be located throughout the state.

Features
 28 cabins
 52 campsites
 gift shop 
 More than 20 miles of hiking trails
 outdoor sports facilities (basketball court, tennis court, volleyball court, horseshoe pit)
  Boley Lake
 rental watercraft (paddleboats, rowboats, canoes)
 swimming pool
 fishing (lake and stream)
 horseback and pony rides (closed)
 naturalist-led hikes and presentations
 picnic shelters
 corn meal and buckwheat flour made at the Glade Creek Grist Mill are available for sale
 scenic overlooks

Accessibility
Accessibility for the disabled was assessed by West Virginia University. The assessment found the campground, picnic shelters, restrooms, and ramps and doorways to public buildings to be accessible. The park also has accessible fishing access and two accessible cabins.  During the 2005 assessment some issues were identified concerning parking lot signage and slippery stairways.

See also

List of West Virginia state parks
Photo Gallery of The Grist Mill

References

External links
 

State parks of West Virginia
State parks of the Appalachians
Protected areas established in 1934
Mill museums in the United States
Industry museums in West Virginia
Museums in Fayette County, West Virginia
Protected areas of Fayette County, West Virginia
Campgrounds in West Virginia
Grinding mills in West Virginia
IUCN Category III
1934 establishments in West Virginia
New River Gorge National Park and Preserve